Unconquered is a 1989 American made-for-television drama film written by Martin Chitwood (story) and Pat Conroy (teleplay). It was directed and produced by Dick Lowry, and co-produced by Martin Chitwood  and Dean Silvers.  The film is based on the struggles of Richmond Flowers, Sr., the Alabama attorney general who opposed many of Governor George Wallace's segregationist policies in the 1960s, and his son, star athlete Richmond Flowers, Jr.

Plot
In 1962 in Montgomery, Alabama, as the fires of racial hatred sweep across the State, one family stands alone, about to face the greatest test of courage and loyalty. State Attorney Richmond Flowers is the only man prepared to stand up and fight against the horrifying injustices destroying his town. But his determination may prove to be the destruction of his family. His son, Rich, is desperate to prove himself against all odds, yet has to fight to simply survive. As the family suffers increasingly brutal attacks at the hands of the enraged community, they must find a strength so great that it can conquer over the hatred that surrounds them.

Cast
 Peter Coyote as Richmond Flowers Sr.
 Dermot Mulroney as Richmond Flowers Jr.
 Tess Harper as Mrs. Mary Flowers
 Jenny Robertson as Cindy
 Frank Whaley as Arnie
 Bob Gunton as Gov. George Wallace
Ted Henning as Judge
 Wilbur Fitzgerald as The Foreman

References

External links
 

1989 films
1989 television films
1989 drama films
American drama television films
CBS network films
Films set in 1962
Films set in Alabama
Films directed by Dick Lowry
1980s English-language films
1980s American films